WBRD (1420 AM) is a radio station broadcasting a Regional Mexican format. Licensed to Palmetto, Florida, United States, the station serves the Bradenton area. The station is owned by Birach Broadcasting Corporation.

The FCC first licensed this station to begin operations on July 31, 1958, using callsign WBRD.

References

External links
 

Birach Broadcasting Corporation stations
Mexican-American culture in Florida
BRD
Regional Mexican radio stations in the United States
BRD